Zhang Boli (born 26 February 1948) is a Chinese physician.

He is honorary president of Tianjin University of Traditional Chinese Medicine and an academician of the Chinese Academy of Engineering. Zhang is also a delegate to the 11th, 12th, and 13th National People's Congress.

Zhang has made outstanding contributions to Traditional Chinese medicine (TCM). During the 2003 SARS outbreak, he used TCM to treat patients. In 2005, he was elected as an academician of the Chinese Academy of Engineering (CAE).

During the 2019–20 COVID-19 pandemic, Zhang strongly advised the use of TCM. With the approval of the Central Guidance Team, he and 208 other experts formed a TCM medical team, and started treating patients in Jiangxia Fangcang Hospital, Wuhan. His son, Zhang Lei, is also a physician. Zhang Lei also arrived in Wuhan to fight against the coronavirus, however, the father and son did not meet each other until the epidemic had waned in Wuhan.

References

1948 births
Living people
People from Xingtai
20th-century Chinese physicians
21st-century Chinese physicians
Members of the Chinese Academy of Engineering
Physicians from Hebei
Traditional Chinese medicine practitioners
Delegates to the 13th National People's Congress
Delegates to the 12th National People's Congress
Delegates to the 11th National People's Congress
2002–2004 SARS outbreak